The 2015 Tipperary Senior Hurling Championship is the 125th staging of the Tipperary Senior Hurling Championship since its establishment by the Tipperary County Board in 1887. The championship began on 4 April 2015 and ended on 25 October 2015.

Thurles Sarsfields were the defending champions and retained their title.

Fixtures and results

Preliminary Quarter final
13 September 
 Nenagh Eire Og 1-21 Roscrea 0-10 
 Portroe 2-26 Killenaule 1-20 (AET) 
 Kilruane MacDonaghs 1-21 JK Brackens 1-9
 Kildangan 2-16 Upperchurch/Drombane 1-10
 Eire Og Annacarty 2-18 Lorrha Dorrha 2-14
 Thurles Sarsfields 3-25 Mullinahone 2-18

Byes for Drom & Inch and Clonoulty/Rossmore

Quarter-finals

Semi-finals

Final

References

Tipperary Senior Hurling Championship
Tipperary Senior Hurling Championship